Here East is a media complex located in the Olympic Park in East London, built specially for the 2012 London Olympics. It is located at the site of the former Hackney Wick Stadium close to the Riverbank Arena in Hackney Wick.

During the Olympics and Paralympics, the complex was named the London Olympics Media Centre. It was later refurbished and renamed to Here East.

History

London Olympics Media Centre

At the time of the Olympic bid it was intended that the complex would be privately financed on the basis that the building would have residual value from alternative uses after the games. As of December 2009, the Olympic Delivery Authority had allocated £702 million of Programme and Funders’ contingency, largely to cover the decisions to publicly fund the Village and Media Centre after it became clear private funding could not be secured on acceptable terms during the 2008 to 2010 economic crisis.

The complex was a 24-hour media hub that catered for over 20,000 broadcasters, photographers and print journalists facilitating broadcasts to 4 billion people worldwide. It contained an International Broadcast Centre (IBC) and a Main Press Centre (MPC).

It had a catering village and a multi-storey car park to link the two main venues (the IBC and the MPC) together. The construction cost was £355 million and the main contractor was Carillion. It was completed in July 2011.

Legacy
Following the games, the property firm Delancey formed a joint venture with Infinity SDC to convert the Olympic broadcast and press centre into a tech hub for corporations. The joint venture was called iCity, with Laing O'Rourke being appointed to carry out the £150 million redevelopment of the Broadcasting Centre. Consultants Buro Happold provided the engineering design, working in collaboration with architects Hawkins\Brown.

BT Sport started broadcasting from the centre in August 2013, and has three studios there.

In February 2014 the site was renamed Here East. It went on to accommodate campuses for Staffordshire University, Loughborough University and University College London as well as Plexal, a co-working location for start-up businesses.

References

External links

 Here East
 BT Sport Studios
 Here East - Mayor of London

Television studios in London
Commercial buildings completed in 2011
2012 Summer Olympics
Buildings and structures in the London Borough of Hackney
Mass media in London
Queen Elizabeth Olympic Park
Hackney, London
Olympic International Broadcast Centres